The 2021 Bryant Bulldogs football team represented Bryant University as a member of the Northeast Conference (NEC) in the 2021 NCAA Division I FCS football season. The Bulldogs, led by third-year head coach Chris Merritt, played their home games at Beirne Stadium.

Schedule

References

Bryant
Bryant Bulldogs football seasons
Bryant Bulldogs football